Events from the year 1859 in Germany.

Incumbents
 King of Bavaria – Maximilian II
 King of Hanover – George V
 King of Prussia – Frederick William IV
 King of Saxony – John of Saxony

Events 

4 February – German scholar Constantin von Tischendorf rediscovers the Codex Sinaiticus, a 4th-century uncial manuscript of the Greek Bible, in Saint Catherine's Monastery on the foot of Mount Sinai, in the Khedivate of Egypt.

Births 

27 January – Wilhelm II of Germany , last Emperor of Germany and King of Prussia (d. 1941 )
3 February – Hugo Junkers, German industrialist, aircraft designer (d. 1935)
7 April – Jacques Loeb, German–American physiologist, biologist (d. 1924)
25 December – Ludwig von Estorff, German general (d. 1943 )

Deaths 
	
20 January – Bettina von Arnim, composer and author (born 1785)
6 May – Alexander von Humboldt, German naturalist and geographer (b. 1769)

8 July – Charlotte von Siebold , German gynecologist (b. 1788 )
28 September – Carl Ritter, German geographer (b. 1779)
4 October – Karl Baedeker, German author, publisher (b. 1801)
22 October – Louis Spohr, German violinist, composer (b. 1784)
16 December – Wilhelm Grimm, German philologist, folklorist (b. 1786)

References 

Years of the 19th century in Germany
Germany
Germany